Loganellia is a genus of jawless fish which lived between 430 and 370 million years ago, during the Silurian and Devonian periods of the Paleozoic. Loganellia belonged to the Thelodonti class and like other Thelodonts possessed scales instead of plate armor.

Loganellia are thought to be more closely related to the crown group of gnathostomes than conodonts. They are noted for their denticle whorls - oropharyngeal denticles that lined their branchial bars - which are thought to be homologous with other, later gnathostome teeth. In this sense, Loganellia may possess the earliest known dental structures related to modern teeth, and would have evolved in the throat, rather than through dermal denticles or jaws.

References

Thelodonti genera
Paleozoic jawless fish
Fossil taxa described in 1990
Fossils of Ireland
Fossils of Canada
Silurian first appearances
Devonian extinctions
Paleozoic life of the Northwest Territories